This is a list of significant characters from the adult animated series Hazbin Hotel and web series Helluva Boss—created, directed, written and produced by Vivienne "VivziePop" Medrano. Some of these characters were originally developed for her 2012 webcomic series ZooPhobia.

Principal characters

Hazbin Hotel

 Charlie Morningstar
 Charlie Morningstar (voiced by Jill Harris; singing voice by Elsie Lovelock (pilot)) is the main protagonist and founder of the titular Hazbin Hotel (originally named the Happy Hotel). She is the daughter of King Lucifer and Queen Lilith, and was born in Hell. She was confirmed to be bisexual by series creator Vivienne Medrano on her Twitter account.

 Vaggie
 Vaggie (voiced by Monica Franco) is the manager of the Hazbin Hotel and Charlie's girlfriend. She is highly supportive of Charlie and has a quick temper. Despite said temper, she often tries to be a level-headed and rational person, and she struggles to keep the hotel's image from being tarnished by Charlie and Angel Dust's antics. Vaggie is a lesbian character. She was originally a character in the webcomic ZooPhobia.

 Angel Dust
 Angel Dust (voiced by Michael Kovach (pilot)) is a gay spider demon adult entertainer, and the first volunteer for Charlie's rehabilitation program. He does not take Charlie's cause seriously, and tends to get into mischief behind her back. He was originally a character in the webcomic ZooPhobia.

 Alastor
 Alastor the "Radio Demon" (voiced by Edward Bosco; singing voice by Gabriel C. Brown (pilot)) is an overlord of Hell. His voice has an effect which imitates radio static, complete with sound effects and theme music. He offers his powers to Charlie to help her maintain her goal of running the hotel, but only for his own amusement. Alastor is an asexual character. He was originally a character in the webcomic ZooPhobia.

 Niffty
 Niffty (voiced by Michelle Marie (pilot)) is a small, hyperactive cyclops demon from the 1950s who is obsessed with cleanliness and men.

 Husk
 Husk (voiced by Mick Lauer) is an ill-tempered, gambling, alcoholic cat demon. According to an animator of Hazbin Hotel, he is pansexual. He was originally a character in the webcomic ZooPhobia.

Helluva Boss

 Blitzo

 Blitzo (pronounced Blitz; voiced by Brandon Rogers, Mason Blomberg (young Blitzo); singing voice by Michael Romeo Ruocco) is the founder of I.M.P. (Immediate Murder Professionals) and the protagonist of Helluva Boss. He has an on-and-off relationship with Stolas. He stalks Moxxie and Millie outside of work, much to Moxxie's annoyance. According to his official Instagram account, he is pansexual.

 Moxxie
 Moxxie (voiced by Richard Steven Horvitz) is the straight man weapons expert of I.M.P. and is married to Millie. He is easily annoyed by Blitzo's immaturity. In September 2020, series creator Vivienne Medrano revealed he is bisexual on her Twitter account.

 Millie
 Millie (voiced by Vivian Nixon, Erica Lindbeck (pilot)) is the bruiser of I.M.P. and is married to Moxxie. She is an extrovert and is not afraid to speak her mind, whether she's expressing excitement or flipping off a coworker. She is also highly protective of Moxxie and will go into a fit of rage if he is in danger.

 Loona
 Loona (voiced by Erica Lindbeck) is the hellhound receptionist of I.M.P. She generally has no interest in matters going on around her. Loona is usually rude and apathetic towards her colleagues. She is the adopted daughter of Blitzo, whom she occasionally shows a softer side to.

 Stolas
 Stolas (voiced by Bryce Pinkham, Leander Lewis (young Stolas), Brock Baker (pilot)) is a Goetial demon of Hell. He has a complicated relationship with Blitzo, whom he often makes flirtatious remarks to. He was married to Stella and has a daughter named Octavia, around whom he acts as a "dorky dad", putting her happiness ahead of everything else.

Recurring characters

Rulers of Hell
Lucifer Morningstar, the king of Hell and Charlie's father. In the Hazbin Hotel pilot, Lucifer is only shown in shadow and in portraits at the hotel. Parts of Lucifer's character designs, such as his staff and the apple emblem on his hat, hint at his tempting of Eve.
Lilith Morningstar, queen of Hell and Charlie's mother. In the Hazbin Hotel pilot, Lilith is only shown in portraits at the hotel.

Overlords of Hell
Rosie, the owner of an emporium. She was originally a character in the webcomic ZooPhobia.
Valentino, the owner of a porn studio in Hell and Angel Dust's abusive boss.
Velvet, an overlord.
Vox, a demon with a television for a head, who is stated to be Alastor's biggest rival.

The von Eldritch family
Bethesda von Eldritch, an aristocrat of Hell and the mother of Helsa and Seviathan, as well as the wife of Frederick.
Frederick von Eldritch, an aristocrat of Hell and the father of Helsa and Seviathan, as well as the husband of Bethesda.
Helsa von Eldritch, Charlie's rival and the spoiled heiress of the von Eldritch family.
Seviathan von Eldritch, Helsa's brother and Charlie's ex-boyfriend.

Goetial demons
Andrealphus, Stolas's ex-brother-in-law and a character in season 2 of Helluva Boss.
Octavia (voiced by Barrett Wilbert Weed, Juliana Sada (young Octavia)), Stolas and Stella's scornful and disenfranchised 17-year-old daughter.
Paimon (voiced by Jonathan Freeman), Stolas's father.
Stella (voiced by Georgina Leahy), Stolas's ex-wife. She despises her ex-husband for cheating on her, going as far as to hire someone to assassinate him.

Other inhabitants of Hell
In addition to the rulers, overlords, and Goetial demons, other beings reside in Hell, including the indigenous hellborns, and the sinners, who were originally humans on Earth.

Hellborns
Asmodeus (voiced by James Monroe Iglehart), the Prince of Lust, and the owner of a popular club in the Lust Ring of Hell known as Ozzie's.
Barbie Wire, Blitzo's twin sister and imp circus performer.
Cash Buckzo (voiced by Freeman), Blitzo's father.
Chazwick Thurman (voiced by Eric Shwartz), a shark demon whom both Moxxie and Millie dated in the past.
Crimson (voiced by Horvitz), Moxxie's father and the leader of a large crime ring. He is very disapproving of Moxxie and his meek nature.
The Egg Bois (voiced by Joe Gran), Sir Pentious' loyal egg minions.
Fat Nuggets, Angel Dust's demonic pet pig.
Fizzarolli (voiced by Alex Brightman, Remy Edgerly (young Fizzarolli)), a jester-like demon and Asmodeus' subordinate.
Joe (voiced by Bosco), Millie's father.
Lin (voiced by Su Jan Chase), Millie's mother.
Mammon, the Prince of Greed.
Mister Butler (voiced by Don Darryl Rivera), the head butler of the Goetial palace.
Razzle and Dazzle, two small goat demons who act as Charlie's personal servants.
Robo Fizz (voiced by Brightman), a robot clone of Fizzarolli who performs at Loo Loo Land.
Sallie May (voiced by Morgana Ignis), Millie's transgender sister.
Striker (voiced by Norman Reedus), an imp who served as Joe's farmhand. He is revealed to be an assassin that Stella hired to kill Stolas.
Tilla, Blitzo's mother and an imp circus performer.
Verosika Mayday (voiced by Cristina Vee), a rude and shameless succubus pop-star and Blitzo's ex-girlfriend. She and her posse take a disliking to I.M.P in the Helluva Boss episode "Spring Broken."
Vortex (voiced by Iglehart), Verosika's hellhound bodyguard.
Wally Wackford (voiced by Rivera), an imp inventor.

Sinners
Arackniss, Angel Dust's older brother. He was originally a character in the webcomic ZooPhobia.
Baxter, a short, anthropomorphic anglerfish demon.
Cherri Bomb (voiced by Krystal LaPorte (pilot), singing voice by Kelly "Chi-Chi" Boyer), a one-eyed demon punk girl and Angel Dust's best friend.
Crymini, an anthropomorphic hellhound.
Henroin, Angel Dust's father. He was originally a character in the webcomic ZooPhobia.
Katie Killjoy (voiced by Faye Mata), the main anchor of 666 News, a news channel in Hell.
Mrs. Mayberry (voiced by Mara Wilson), a former human teacher who murdered her husband for cheating on her before committing suicide. After Mrs. Mayberry arrives in Hell, she hires I.M.P. to kill the woman her husband cheated with.
Mimzy, a short and chubby demon. She was originally a character in the webcomic ZooPhobia.
Loopty Goopty (voiced by Rogers), an inventor who hires I.M.P. to kill his business partner, Lyle Lipton.
Lyle Lipton (voiced by Michael James Ruocco), Loopty Goopty's business partner.
Sir Pentious (voiced by Will Stamper (pilot)), an anthropomorphic cobra demon from the Victorian era.
Tom Trench (voiced by Joshua Tomar), the 666 News' assistant anchor.

Inhabitants of Heaven
C.H.E.R.U.B. is a group of cherubs who have the opposite purpose of I.M.P., helping and blessing humans on orders of souls in Heaven. They are very small. Members of C.H.E.R.U.B. include:
Cletus (voiced by Rivera), a sensible pink cherub, and the leader of the group.
Collin (voiced by Jayden Libran), a meek purple cherub.
Keenie (voiced by Vivienne Medrano), a yellow and spritely cherub.
Deerie (voiced by Medrano), a snarky deer-like cherub who bans C.H.E.R.U.B. from reentering Heaven after they accidentally kill Lyle Lipton.
Exterminators, a type of angel sent to purge Hell once a year due to its overpopulation problem. They are tall, slim, and gray, with large horns and wings.

Human characters
Eddie (voiced by Horvitz), a child whom I.M.P. killed in the Helluva Boss pilot.
Martha (voiced by Jinkx Monsoon), the woman Mrs. Mayberry's husband cheated on with. She maintains the public appearance of a wholesome and happy mother and wife, but she and her family are murderous cannibals behind closed doors. She is married and has a son and a daughter.
Ralphie (voiced by Maxwell Atoms), Martha's husband.
Agent One (voiced by Michael Romeo Ruocco), an agent from an organization called "D.H.O.R.K.S.", who want to expose the existence of demons to the world.
Agent Two (voiced by Erica Luttrell), an agent from "D.H.O.R.K.S." and Agent One's partner.

Other characters
An unnamed demon who was featured prominently in the "Addict" music video.
Molly, Angel Dust's twin sister. She was originally a character in the webcomic ZooPhobia.
Roo, a demon who nothing is known about and who will be explored later in the series.
Travis (voiced by Rivera), a demon who had sex with Angel Dust in the Hazbin Hotel pilot. He made a cameo appearance in the Helluva Boss episode "Spring Broken."
Villa, an anthropomorphic poodle demon with two large pigtails.

References

External links

Hazbin Hotel characters, List of
Hazbin Hotel
Fiction about the afterlife
Hell in popular culture
Demons in television
Genocide in fiction
 
Hazbin Hotel